Aidan Nolan (born 1993) is an Irish hurler who plays as a midfielder or half-forward for the Wexford senior team and Half Way House Bunclody.

Honours

Wexford 
 Leinster Senior Hurling Championship (1): 2019
 Leinster Under-21 Hurling Championship (3): 2013, 2014

References

1993 births
Living people
HWH Bunclody hurlers
Wexford inter-county hurlers